Robert Kirkland may refer to:

 Robert Lamont Kirkland, British general
 Robert Kirkland, founder of the Discovery Park of America
 Robert Kirkland (curler) (Bobby Kirkland), Scottish curler